The Bermuda Bicycle Association or BBA is the national governing body of cycle racing in Bermuda.

The BBA is a member of the UCI and COPACI.

External links
 Bermuda Bicycle Association official website

Cycle racing organizations
Cycling
Cycle racing in Bermuda